Signéville is a commune in the Haute-Marne department in north-eastern France. It had a population of 90 in 2019.

See also
Communes of the Haute-Marne department

References

Communes of Haute-Marne